The 1984–85 AHL season was the 49th season of the American Hockey League. Thirteen teams played 80 games each in the schedule. The Binghamton Whalers finished first overall in the regular season. The Sherbrooke Canadiens won their first Calder Cup championship.

Team changes
 The Sherbrooke Jets cease operations.
 The Nova Scotia Voyageurs move to Sherbrooke, Quebec, becoming the Sherbrooke Canadiens.
 The Nova Scotia Oilers join the AHL as an expansion team, based in Halifax, Nova Scotia, playing in the North Division.
 The Moncton Alpines become the Moncton Golden Flames.

Final standings
Note: GP = Games played; W = Wins; L = Losses; T = Ties; GF = Goals for; GA = Goals against; Pts = Points;

Scoring leaders

Note: GP = Games played; G = Goals; A = Assists; Pts = Points; PIM = Penalty minutes

 complete list

Calder Cup playoffs

Trophy and award winners
Team awards

Individual awards

Other awards

See also
List of AHL seasons

References
AHL official site
AHL Hall of Fame
HockeyDB

 
American Hockey League seasons
2
2